This is a list of 609 species in Aphis, a genus of aphids in the family Aphididae.

Aphis species

 Aphis aba  c g
 Aphis acaenaevora Mier Durante & Ortego, 1998 c g
 Aphis acaenovinae Eastop, 1961 c g
 Aphis acanthoidis (Börner, 1940) c g
 Aphis acanthopanaci Matsumura, 1917 c g
 Aphis acetosae Linnaeus, 1767 c g
 Aphis achillearadicis Pashtshenko, 1992 c g
 Aphis achyranthi Theobald, F.V., 1929 c g
 Aphis acrita Smith, C.F., 1940 c g
 Aphis acuminata Nieto Nafría & von Dohlen, 2016 c g
 Aphis adesmiae Delfino, 2009 c g
 Aphis affinis Del Guercio, 1911 c g
 Aphis agastachyos Hille Ris Lambers, 1974 c g
 Aphis agrariae  c g
 Aphis albella  c g
 Aphis alchemillae (Börner, 1940) c g
 Aphis alhagis (Zhang, Guangxue, Xiaolin Chen, Tiesen Zhong & Jin c g
 Aphis alienus  c g
 Aphis alstroemeriae Essig, 1953 c g
 Aphis althaeae (Nevsky, 1929) c g
 Aphis amaranthi Holman, 1974 c g
 Aphis angelicae  c g
 Aphis antherici  c g
 Aphis apigraveolens Essig, 1938 c g
 Aphis apocynicola  c g
 Aphis aquilonalis Stekolshchikov & Khruleva, 2015 c g
 Aphis araliaeradicis (Strom, 1938) c g
 Aphis arbuti Ferrari, 1872 c g
 Aphis arctiumi  c g
 Aphis argrimoniae  c g
 Aphis armata  c g
 Aphis artemifoliae Shinji, 1922 c g
 Aphis artemisiphaga Holman, 1987 c g
 Aphis artemisiphila Holman, 1987 c g
 Aphis artemisivora  c g
 Aphis asclepiadis Fitch, 1851 c g b
 Aphis astericola Tissot, 1933 c g
 Aphis astilbes Matsumura, 1917 c g
 Aphis astragali Ossiannilsson, 1959 c g
 Aphis astragalicola  c g
 Aphis astragalina Hille Ris Lambers, 1974 c g
 Aphis atromaculata Hille Ris Lambers, 1974 c g
 Aphis atuberculata Hille Ris Lambers, 1955 c g
 Aphis aubletia Sanborn, 1904 c g
 Aphis aurantii Boyer de Fonscolombe, 1841 c g
 Aphis austriaca Hille Ris Lambers, 1959 c g
 Aphis axyriphaga Pashtshenko, 1993 c g
 Aphis axyriradicis Pashtshenko, 1993 c g
 Aphis baccharicola Hille Ris Lambers, 1974 c g
 Aphis ballotae Passerini, 1860 c g
 Aphis balloticola Szelegiewicz, 1968 g
 Aphis berberidorum Ortego & Mier Durante, 1997 c g
 Aphis beringiensis Stekolshchikov & Khruleva, 2015 c g
 Aphis berlinskii Huculak, 1968 c g
 Aphis berteroae Szelegiewicz, 1966 c g
 Aphis biobiensis Nieto Nafría & Mier Durante, 2016 c g
 Aphis boydstoni Pike, 2004 c g
 Aphis bozhkoae Eastop & Blackman, 2005 c g
 Aphis brachychaeta  c g
 Aphis brachysiphon  c g
 Aphis breviseta  c g
 Aphis brevitarsis Szelegiewicz, 1963 c g
 Aphis brohmeri Börner, 1952 c g
 Aphis brotericola Mier Durante, 1978 c g
 Aphis brunellae Schouteden, 1903 c g
 Aphis brunnea Ferrari, 1872 c g
 Aphis bupleuri (Börner, 1932) c g
 Aphis bupleurisensoriata  c g
 Aphis cacaliasteris Hille Ris Lambers, 1947 c g
 Aphis calaminthae (Börner, 1952) c g
 Aphis caliginosa Hottes & Frison, 1931 c g
 Aphis callunae  c g
 Aphis canae Williams, T.A., 1911 c g
 Aphis caprifoliae  c g
 Aphis carduella Walsh, 1863 b
 Aphis cari Essig, 1917 c g
 Aphis caroliboerneri (Remaudière, G., 1952) c g
 Aphis carrilloi Ortego, Mier Durante & Nieto Nafría, 2013 c g
 Aphis carverae Hales, Foottit & Maw, 2014 c g
 Aphis caryopteridis  c g
 Aphis catalpae  c g
 Aphis ceanothi Clarke, 1903 c g
 Aphis celastrii Matsumura, 1917 c g
 Aphis celtis Shinji, 1922 c g
 Aphis cephalanthi Thomas, C., 1878 c g b
 Aphis cephalariae Barjadze, 2011 c g
 Aphis cerasi  c g
 Aphis cerastii (Börner, 1950) c g
 Aphis cercocarpi Gillette & M.A. Palmer, 1929 c g
 Aphis chaetosiphon (Qiao, Jianfeng Wang & Guangxue Zhang, 2008) c g
 Aphis chetansapa Hottes & Frison, 1931 c g
 Aphis chilopsidi  c g
 Aphis chloris Koch, 1854 c g b
 Aphis chrysothamni Wilson, H.F., 1915 c g
 Aphis chrysothamnicola (Gillette & M.A. Palmer, 1929) c g
 Aphis ciceri  c g
 Aphis cichorea  c g
 Aphis cimicifugae Holman, 1987 c g
 Aphis cinerea Nieto Nafría & Ortego, 2002 c g
 Aphis cirsiioleracei (Börner, 1932) c g
 Aphis cirsiphila Pashtshenko, 1992 c g
 Aphis cisti  c g
 Aphis cisticola Leclant & G. Remaudière, 1972 c g
 Aphis citricidus  c g
 Aphis citricola Van Der Goot, 1912 i
 Aphis citrina  c g
 Aphis clematicola Pashtshenko, 1994 c g
 Aphis clematidis Koch, C.L., 1854 c g
 Aphis clematiphaga Pashtshenko, 1994 c g
 Aphis clerodendri Matsumura, 1917 c g
 Aphis cliftonensis Stroyan, 1964 c g
 Aphis clinepetae Pashtshenko, 1993 c g
 Aphis clinopodii Passerini, 1861 c g
 Aphis clydesmithi Stroyan, 1970 c g
 Aphis coffeata  c g
 Aphis comari  c g
 Aphis commensalis Stroyan, 1952 c g
 Aphis comodoensis  c g
 Aphis comosa (Börner, 1950) c g
 Aphis conflicta Nieto Nafría, Ortego & Mier Durante, 2008 c g
 Aphis confusa Walker, F., 1849 c g
 Aphis coprosmae  c g
 Aphis coreopsidis (Thomas, C., 1878) c g b
 Aphis coridifoliae Mier Durante & Ortego, 1999 c g
 Aphis cornifoliae Fitch, 1851 c g b
 Aphis coronillae Ferrari, 1872 c g
 Aphis coronopifoliae Bartholomew, P.S., 1932 c g
 Aphis costalis  c g
 Aphis cottieri  c g
 Aphis coweni Palmer, M.A., 1938 c g
 Aphis craccae Linnaeus, 1758 c g b
 Aphis craccivora Koch, 1854 i c g b  (cowpea aphid)
 Aphis crassicauda Smith, C.F. & Eckel, 1996 c g
 Aphis crepidis (Börner, 1940) c g
 Aphis crinosa  c g
 Aphis crypta Pack & Knowlton, 1929 c g
 Aphis curtiseta Holman, 1998 c g
 Aphis cuscutae Davis, 1919 c g
 Aphis cuyana López Ciruelos & Ortego, 2017 c g
 Aphis cynoglossi  c g
 Aphis cytisorum Hartig, 1841 c g
 Aphis danielae Remaudière, G., 1994 c g
 Aphis dasiphorae  c g
 Aphis decepta Hottes & Frison, 1931 c g
 Aphis delicatula  c g
 Aphis dianthi  c g
 Aphis dianthiphaga Pashtshenko, 1993 c g
 Aphis diluta Pashtshenko, 1994 c g
 Aphis diospyri Thomas, C., 1879 c g
 Aphis dlabolai  c g
 Aphis dolichii  c g
 Aphis dragocephalus  c g
 Aphis droserae Takahashi, R., 1921 c g
 Aphis dubia  c g
 Aphis duckmountainensis Rojanavongse & Robinson, 1977 c g
 Aphis ecballii  c g
 Aphis egomae Shinji, 1922 c g
 Aphis elatinoidei Nevsky, 1929 c g
 Aphis elegantula Szelegiewicz, 1963 c g
 Aphis epilobiaria  c g
 Aphis epilobii Kaltenbach, 1843 c g
 Aphis equiseticola Ossiannilsson, 1964 c g
 Aphis erigerontis  c g
 Aphis eryngiiglomerata  c g
 Aphis esulae (Börner, 1940) c g
 Aphis etiolata Stroyan, 1952 c g
 Aphis eucollinae López Ciruelos & Ortego, 2016 c g
 Aphis eugeniae van der Goot, 1917 c
 Aphis eugeniae van-der Goot, 1917 g
 Aphis eugenyi  c g
 Aphis eupatorii Passerini, 1863 c g
 Aphis euphorbiae Kaltenbach, 1843 c g
 Aphis euphorbicola Rezwani & Lampel, 1990 c g
 Aphis explorata  c g
 Aphis exsors  c g
 Aphis fabae Scopoli, 1763 i c g b  (black bean aphid)
 Aphis farinosa Gmelin, 1790 c g b
 Aphis feminea Hottes, 1930 c g
 Aphis filifoliae (Gillette & M.A. Palmer, 1928) c g
 Aphis filipendulae Matsumura, 1917 c g
 Aphis fluvialis  c g
 Aphis fluviatilis Bozhko, 1976 g
 Aphis foeniculivora Zhang, Guangxue, 1983 c g
 Aphis folsomii Davis, 1908 c g b
 Aphis forbesi Weed, 1889 c g b  (strawberry root louse)
 Aphis frangulae Kaltenbach, 1845 c g
 Aphis franzi Holman, 1975 c g
 Aphis fraserae Gillette & M.A. Palmer, 1929 c g
 Aphis frisoni (Hottes, 1954) c g
 Aphis fuckii Shinji, 1922 g
 Aphis fukii Shinji, 1922 c g
 Aphis fumanae Remaudière, G. & Leclant, 1972 c g
 Aphis funitecta (Börner, 1950) c g
 Aphis galiae  c g
 Aphis galiiscabri Schrank, 1801 c g
 Aphis gallowayi Robinson, 1991 c g
 Aphis genistae Scopoli, 1763 c g
 Aphis gentianae (Börner, 1940) c g
 Aphis gerardiae (Thomas, C., 1879) c g
 Aphis gerardianae  c g
 Aphis glareosae  c g
 Aphis globosa Pashtshenko, 1992 c g
 Aphis glycines Matsumura, 1917 c g b  (soybean aphid)
 Aphis gossypii Glover, 1877 i c g b  (cotton aphid)
 Aphis grandis  c g
 Aphis grata Pashtshenko, 1994 c g
 Aphis gratiolae  c g
 Aphis gregalis Knowlton, 1928 c g
 Aphis grosmannae (Börner, 1952) c g
 Aphis grossulariae Kaltenbach, 1843 c g
 Aphis gurnetensis  c g
 Aphis gutierrezis (Pack & Knowlton, 1929) c g
 Aphis gypsophilae  c g
 Aphis hamamelidis Pepper, 1950 c g
 Aphis haroi  c g
 Aphis hasanica Pashtshenko, 1994 c g
 Aphis healyi Cottier, 1953 c g
 Aphis hederae Kaltenbach, 1843 c g b  (ivy aphid)
 Aphis hederiphaga  c g
 Aphis hedysari  c g
 Aphis heiei Holman, 1998 c g
 Aphis helianthemi Ferrari, 1872 c g
 Aphis heraclicola  c g
 Aphis hermistonii Wilson, H.F., 1915 c g
 Aphis herniariae Mamontova, 1963 c g
 Aphis hieracii Schrank, 1801 c g
 Aphis hillerislambersi  c g
 Aphis hiltoni  c g
 Aphis hispanica Hille Ris Lambers, 1959 c g
 Aphis holodisci Robinson, 1984 c g
 Aphis holoenotherae Rakauskas, 2007 c g
 Aphis horii Takahashi, R., 1923 c g
 Aphis humuli (Tseng & Tao, 1938) c
 Aphis hyosciama Kittel, 1827 g
 Aphis hyperici Monell, 1879 c g
 Aphis hypericiphaga Pashtshenko, 1993 c g
 Aphis hypericiradicis Pashtshenko, 1993 c g
 Aphis hypochoeridis (Börner, 1940) c g
 Aphis ichigo Shinji, 1922 c g
 Aphis ichigocola Shinji, 1924 c g
 Aphis idaei van der Goot, 1912 c
 Aphis idaei van-der Goot, 1912 g
 Aphis ilicis Kaltenbach, 1843 c g
 Aphis illinoiensis Shimer, 1866 g
 Aphis illinoisensis Shimer, 1866 c g b  (grapevine aphid)
 Aphis impatientis Thomas, C., 1878 c g
 Aphis impatiphila Pashtshenko, 1993 c g
 Aphis impatiradicis Pashtshenko, 1993 c g
 Aphis incerta Nevsky, 1929 c g
 Aphis indigoferae Shinji, 1922 c g
 Aphis inedita  c g
 Aphis infrequens Knowlton, 1929 c g
 Aphis intrusa Ortego, 1998 c g
 Aphis intybi Koch, C.L., 1855 c g
 Aphis ishkovi Kadyrbekov, 2001 c g
 Aphis iteae (Tissot, 1933) c g
 Aphis jacetana García Prieto & Nieto Nafría, 2005 c g
 Aphis jacobaeae Schrank, 1801 c g
 Aphis jani Ferrari, 1872 c g
 Aphis janischi (Börner, 1940) c g
 Aphis jurineae  c g
 Aphis kachiae  c g
 Aphis kachkoulii Remaudière, G., 1989 c g
 Aphis kalopanacis (Hori, 1927) c g
 Aphis kamtchatica Pashtshenko, 1994 c g
 Aphis klimeschi (Börner, 1950) c g
 Aphis kobachidzei (Rusanova, 1941) c g
 Aphis kogomecola Matsumura, 1917 c g
 Aphis korshunovi  c g
 Aphis kosarovi  c g
 Aphis kurosawai Takahashi, R., 1921 c g
 Aphis laciniariae Gillette & M.A. Palmer, 1929 c g
 Aphis lactucae Shinji, 1922 c g
 Aphis lambersi (Börner, 1940) c g
 Aphis lamiorum (Börner, 1950) c g
 Aphis lantanae Koch, C.L., 1854 c g
 Aphis lavaterae Kittel, 1827 g
 Aphis leontodontis (Börner, 1950) c g
 Aphis leonulii  c g
 Aphis lhasaensis Zhang, Guangxue, 1981 c g
 Aphis lhasartemisiae Zhang, Guangxue, 1981 c g
 Aphis lichtensteini Leclant & G. Remaudière, 1972 c g
 Aphis ligulariae Holman, 1987 c g
 Aphis liliophaga  c g
 Aphis limonicola Pashtshenko, 1993 c g
 Aphis lindae  c g
 Aphis lini  c g
 Aphis linorum  c g
 Aphis lithospermi Wilson, H.F., 1915 c g
 Aphis longicauda (Baker, A.C., 1920) c g
 Aphis longicaudata  c g
 Aphis longini Huculak, 1968 c g
 Aphis longirostris (Börner, 1950) c g
 Aphis longisetosa Basu, A.N., 1970 c g
 Aphis longituba Hille Ris Lambers, 1966 c g
 Aphis loti  c g
 Aphis lotiradicis Stroyan, 1972 c g
 Aphis lugentis Williams, T.A., 1911 c g
 Aphis lupinehansoni Knowlton, 1935 c g
 Aphis lupini Gillette & Palmer, 1929 c g b
 Aphis lupoi  c g
 Aphis lupuli  c g
 Aphis lycopicola  c g
 Aphis lysimachiae  c g
 Aphis maculatae Oestlund, 1887 c g b  (spotted poplar aphid)
 Aphis madderae Robinson, 1979 c g
 Aphis madronae  c g
 Aphis magnoliae Macchiati, 1883 c g
 Aphis magnopilosa  c g
 Aphis maidiradicis Forbes, 1891 g
 Aphis malahuina  c g
 Aphis malalhuina Mier Durante, Nieto Nafría & Ortego, 2003 c g
 Aphis mammulata Gimingham & Hille Ris Lambers, 1949 c g
 Aphis mamonthovae  c g
 Aphis manitobensis Robinson & Rojanavongse, 1976 c g
 Aphis marthae Essig, 1953 c g
 Aphis martinezi Nieto Nafría, Ortego & Mier Durante, 1999 c g
 Aphis masoni Richards, 1963 c g
 Aphis mastichinae Pérez Hidalgo & Nieto Nafría, 2004 c g
 Aphis matilei Nieto Nafría, Ortego & Mier Durante, 2000 c g
 Aphis matricariae Barjadze & Özdemir, 2014 c g
 Aphis maulensis Mier Durante & García-Tejero, 2016 c g
 Aphis medicaginis Koch, C.L., 1854 c g
 Aphis meijigusae Shinji, 1922 c g
 Aphis melosae Mier Durante & Ortego, 1999 c g
 Aphis mendocina Mier Durante, Ortego & Nieto Nafría, 2006 c g
 Aphis middletonii Thomas, 1879 i
 Aphis mimuli Oestlund, 1887 c g
 Aphis minima (Tissot, 1933) c g
 Aphis minutissima (Gillette & M.A. Palmer, 1928) c g
 Aphis mirifica (Börner, 1950) c g
 Aphis mizutakarashi  c g
 Aphis mizzou Lagos-Kutz & Puttler, 2012 c g
 Aphis mohelnensis Holman, 1998 c g
 Aphis molluginis (Börner, 1950) c g
 Aphis monardae Oestlund, 1887 c g
 Aphis mongolica Szelegiewicz, 1963 c g
 Aphis montanicola Hille Ris Lambers, 1950 c g
 Aphis morae Kittel, 1827 g
 Aphis mori Clarke, 1903 c g
 Aphis morletti  c g
 Aphis mulini Hille Ris Lambers, 1974 c g
 Aphis mulinicola Hille Ris Lambers, 1974 c g
 Aphis multiflorae  c g
 Aphis mumfordi  c g
 Aphis mutini Pashtshenko, 1994 c g
 Aphis myopori Macchiati, 1882 c g
 Aphis myrsinitidis Petrovi?-Obradovi? & Leclant, 1998 c g
 Aphis narzikulovi Szelegiewicz, 1963 c g
 Aphis nasturtii Kaltenbach, 1843 i c g b  (buckthorn aphid)
 Aphis neilliae Oestlund, 1887 c g
 Aphis nelsonensis Cottier, 1953 c g
 Aphis neoartemisiphila Pashtshenko, 1992 c g
 Aphis neogillettei Palmer, 1938 c g b
 Aphis neomexicana (Cockerell, W.P. & T.D.A. Cockerell, 1901) c g
 Aphis neomonardae Rojanavongse & Robinson, 1977 c g
 Aphis neonewtoni Pashtshenko, 1993 c g
 Aphis neopolygoni  c g
 Aphis neospiraeae  c g
 Aphis neothalictri Pashtshenko, 1994 c g
 Aphis nepetae Kaltenbach, 1843 c g
 Aphis nerii Fonscolombe, 1841 i c g b  (oleander aphid)
 Aphis nevskyi  c g
 Aphis newtoni  c g
 Aphis nigra (Wilson, H.F., 1911) c g
 Aphis nigratibialis Robinson, 1969 c g
 Aphis nivalis Hille Ris Lambers, 1960 c g
 Aphis nonveilleri Petrovi?-Obradovi? & G. Remaudière, 2002 c g
 Aphis nudicauda  c g
 Aphis obiensis  c g
 Aphis ochropus Koch, C.L., 1854 c g
 Aphis odinae (van der Goot, 1917) c g
 Aphis odorikonis Matsumura, 1917 c g
 Aphis oenotherae Oestlund, 1887 i c g
 Aphis oestlundi Gillette, 1927 i c g b
 Aphis ogilviei  c g
 Aphis onagraphaga Pashtshenko, 1993 c g
 Aphis ononidis (Schouteden, 1903) c g
 Aphis orchidis  c g
 Aphis oregonensis Wilson, H.F., 1915 c g
 Aphis origani Passerini, 1860 c g
 Aphis ornata (Gillette & M.A. Palmer, 1929) c g
 Aphis orocantabrica García Prieto & Nieto Nafría, 2005 c g
 Aphis oxytropiradicis Pashtshenko, 1993 c g
 Aphis oxytropis Pashtshenko, 1993 c g
 Aphis paludicola Hille Ris Lambers, 1959 c g
 Aphis panzeriae  c g
 Aphis papaveris Fabricius, 1777 c g
 Aphis papillosa Mier Durante, Nieto Nafría & Ortego, 2003 c g
 Aphis paralios Hille Ris Lambers ex Ilharco, 1974 g
 Aphis paravanoi Nieto Nafría, Ortego & Mier Durante, 1999 c g
 Aphis paraverbasci  c g
 Aphis parietariae  c g
 Aphis pashtshenkoae Remaudière, G., 1997 c g
 Aphis passeriniana (Del Guercio, 1900) c g
 Aphis patagonica Blanchard, Everard Eel, 1944 c g
 Aphis patriniae  c g
 Aphis patrinicola Holman, 1987 c g
 Aphis patriniphila  c g
 Aphis patvaliphaga Pashtshenko, 1994 c g
 Aphis pavlovskii  c g
 Aphis pawneepae Hottes, 1934 c g
 Aphis pediculariphaga Pashtshenko, 1994 c g
 Aphis pentstemonicola Gillette & M.A. Palmer, 1929 c g
 Aphis periplocophila Zhang, Guangxue, 1983 c g
 Aphis pernilleae  c g
 Aphis peucedani  c g
 Aphis peucedanicarvifoliae  c g
 Aphis phaceliae Gillette & M.A. Palmer, 1929 c g
 Aphis philadelphicola Pashtshenko, 1991 c g
 Aphis phlojodicarpi Pashtshenko, 1993 c g
 Aphis picridicola  c g
 Aphis picridis (Börner, 1950) c g
 Aphis pilosellae (Börner, 1952) c g
 Aphis pilosicauda Gillette & M.A. Palmer, 1932 c g
 Aphis piperis Kittel, 1827 g
 Aphis plantaginis Goeze, 1778 c g
 Aphis platylobii Carver & White, 1970 c g
 Aphis pleurospermi Pashtshenko, 1993 c g
 Aphis poacyni Zhang, Guangxue, Xiaolin Chen, Tiesen Zhong & Jing c g
 Aphis podagrariae Schrank, 1801 c g
 Aphis polaris Stekolshchikov & Khruleva, 2014 c g
 Aphis polemoniradicis Pashtshenko, 1993 c g
 Aphis polii Barjadze, Blackman & Özdemir, 2015 c g
 Aphis pollinaria (Börner, 1952) c g
 Aphis polygonacea Matsumura, 1917 c g
 Aphis polygonata  c g
 Aphis pomi De Geer, 1773 c g b  (apple aphid)
 Aphis ponomarenkoi Holman, 1987 c g
 Aphis popovi Mordvilko, 1931 c g
 Aphis potentillae Nevsky, 1929 c g
 Aphis praeterita Walker, F., 1849 c g
 Aphis proffti (Börner, 1942) c g
 Aphis propinqua  c g
 Aphis psammophila Szelegiewicz, 1967 c g
 Aphis pseudeuphorbiae Hille Ris Lambers, 1948 c g
 Aphis pseudocomosa Stroyan, 1972 c g
 Aphis pseudocytisorum Hille Ris Lambers, 1967 c g
 Aphis pseudolysimachiae Heikenheimo, 1978 c g
 Aphis pseudopaludicola  c g
 Aphis pseudopulchella Blanchard, Everard Eel, 1944 c g
 Aphis pseudovalerianae Gillette & M.A. Palmer, 1932 c g
 Aphis pulchella Hottes & Frison, 1931 c g
 Aphis pulegi Del Guercio, 1911 c g
 Aphis pulsatillaephaga Pashtshenko, 1994 c g
 Aphis pulsatillicola  c g
 Aphis punicae Passerini, 1863 c g
 Aphis pyri Kittel, 1827 g
 Aphis pyriphaga  c g
 Aphis raji (Kumar & Burkhardt, 1970) c g
 Aphis ramona Swain, 1918 c g
 Aphis rectolactens  c g
 Aphis remaudieri  c g
 Aphis renjifoanae Ortego & Nieto Nafría, 2016 c g
 Aphis reticulata Wilson, H.F., 1915 c g
 Aphis rhamnellae Shinji, 1922 c g
 Aphis rhamnicola Lee, Yerim, Seungwhan Lee & Hyojoong Kim, 2015 c g
 Aphis rhamnifila  c g
 Aphis rheicola  c g
 Aphis rhoicola Hille Ris Lambers, 1954 c g
 Aphis ripariae Oestlund, 1886 c g
 Aphis roberti Nieto Nafría, Ortego & Mier Durante, 1999 c g
 Aphis roepkei (Hille Ris Lambers, 1931) c g
 Aphis roripae (Palmer, M.A., 1938) c g
 Aphis roumanica  c g
 Aphis rubiae  c g
 Aphis rubicola Oestlund, 1887 c g
 Aphis rubicolens  c g
 Aphis rubifolii (Thomas, C., 1879) c g b
 Aphis rubiradicis Robinson, 1969 c g
 Aphis ruborum  c g
 Aphis rukavishnikovi (Ivanovskaya, 1981) c g
 Aphis rumicis Linnaeus, 1758 c g b  (black aphid)
 Aphis rutae  c g
 Aphis salicariae Koch, C.L., 1855 c g
 Aphis salsolae (Börner, 1940) c g
 Aphis salviae Walker, F., 1852 c g
 Aphis sambuci Linnaeus, 1758 c g b  (elder aphid)
 Aphis sanguisorbae Schrank, 1801 c g
 Aphis sanguisorbicola  c g
 Aphis saniculae Williams, T.A., 1911 c g
 Aphis sarothamni Franssen, 1928 g
 Aphis sassceri Wilson, H.F., 1911 c g
 Aphis sativae Williams, T.A., 1911 c g
 Aphis saussurearadicis Pashtshenko, 1992 c g
 Aphis schilderi (Börner, 1940) c g
 Aphis schinifoliae Blanchard, Everard Eel, 1939 c g
 Aphis schinivora Ortego, Nieto Nafría & Mier Durante, 2007 c g
 Aphis schneideri (Börner, 1940) c g
 Aphis schuhi Robinson, 1984 c g
 Aphis scirpi Kittel, 1827 g
 Aphis sedi Kaltenbach, 1843 c g
 Aphis sediradicis Pashtshenko, 1993 c g
 Aphis selini (Börner, 1940) c g
 Aphis sempervivae  c g
 Aphis seneciocrepiphaga Pashtshenko, 1992 c g
 Aphis senecionicoides Blanchard, Everard Eel, 1944 c g
 Aphis senecionis Williams, T.A., 1911 c g
 Aphis senecioradicis (Gillette & M.A. Palmer, 1929) c g
 Aphis sensoriataeuphorbii  c g
 Aphis septentrionalis Pashtshenko, 1994 c g
 Aphis serissae Shinji, 1922 c g
 Aphis serpylli Koch, C.L., 1854 c g
 Aphis serratularadicis Pashtshenko, 1992 c g
 Aphis seselii  c g
 Aphis shaposhnikovi Holman, 1987 c g
 Aphis sierra Essig, 1947 c g
 Aphis silaumi  c g
 Aphis silenephaga Pashtshenko, 1993 c g
 Aphis silenicola  c g
 Aphis smilacisina Zhang, Guangxue, 1983 c g
 Aphis smirnovi  c g
 Aphis soan  c g
 Aphis sogdiana Nevsky, 1929 c g
 Aphis solanella Theobald, F.V., 1914 c g
 Aphis solani Kittel, 1827 g
 Aphis solidaginis (Börner, 1950) c g
 Aphis solidagophila Pashtshenko, 1992 c g
 Aphis solitaria (Baker, J.M., 1934) c g
 Aphis spiraecola Patch, 1914 c g b  (spirea aphid)
 Aphis spiraephaga  c g
 Aphis spiraephila Patch, 1914 c g
 Aphis stachydis  c g
 Aphis stranvaesiae Takahashi, R., 1937 c g
 Aphis subnitida (Börner, 1940) c g
 Aphis subviridis (Börner, 1940) c g
 Aphis succisae  c g
 Aphis sugadairensis  c g
 Aphis sumire  c g
 Aphis swezeyi Fullaway, 1910 c g
 Aphis symphyti Schrank, 1801 c g
 Aphis sywangi Zhang, Guangxue, Xiaolin Chen, Tiesen Zhong & Jing c g
 Aphis tacita Huculak, 1968 c g
 Aphis takagii  c g
 Aphis talgarica Kadyrbekov, 2001 c g
 Aphis taraxacicola (Börner, 1940) c g
 Aphis tashevi Szelegiewicz, 1962 c g
 Aphis taukogi  c g
 Aphis tehuelchis Nieto Nafría & López Ciruelos, 2016 c g
 Aphis tetradymia Knowlton, 1941 c g
 Aphis teucrii (Börner, 1942) c g
 Aphis thalictri Koch, 1854 c g b
 Aphis thaspii Oestlund, 1887 c g
 Aphis thecomae  c g
 Aphis thermophila (Börner, 1950) c g
 Aphis thesii  c g
 Aphis thomasi (Börner, 1950) c g
 Aphis tianschanica Kadyrbekov, 2001 c g
 Aphis tirucallis Hille Ris Lambers, 1954 c g
 Aphis tomenthosi  c g
 Aphis toriliae  c g
 Aphis tormentillae Passerini, 1879 c g
 Aphis torquens Holman, 1959 c g
 Aphis triglochini Theobald, 1926 g
 Aphis triglochinidis Theobald, 1926 g
 Aphis triglochinis  c g
 Aphis tripolii  c g
 Aphis tsujii Shinji, 1922 c g
 Aphis typhae  c g
 Aphis ucrainensis  c g
 Aphis ulicis Walker, F., 1870 c g
 Aphis ulmariae Schrank, 1801 c g
 Aphis umbelliferarum (Shaposhnikov, 1950) c g
 Aphis umbrella (Börner, 1950) c g
 Aphis unaweepiensis Hottes, 1948 c g
 Aphis urticata Gmelin, 1790 c g b
 Aphis utahensis (Knowlton, 1947) c g
 Aphis utilis Zhang, Guangxue, 1983 c g
 Aphis utsugicola Monzen, 1929 c g
 Aphis uvaeursi Ossiannilsson, 1959 c g
 Aphis vaccinii (Börner, 1940) c g
 Aphis valerianae Cowen, J.H., 1895 c g
 Aphis vallei Hille Ris Lambers & Stroyan, 1959 c g
 Aphis varians Patch, 1914 c g b
 Aphis verae  c g
 Aphis veratri Walker, F., 1852 c g
 Aphis verbasci Schrank, 1801 c g
 Aphis vernoniae Thomas, C., 1878 c g
 Aphis veronicicola Holman, 1987 c g
 Aphis veroniciphaga Kim, Hyojoong & Wonhoon Lee, 2006 c g
 Aphis verticillatae (Börner, 1940) c g
 Aphis viburni Scopoli, 1763 c g
 Aphis viburniphila Patch, 1917 c g
 Aphis victoriae (Martin, J.H., 1991) c g
 Aphis vineti  c g
 Aphis violae Schouteden, 1900 c g
 Aphis violaeradicis Pashtshenko, 1994 c g
 Aphis virburniphila  c g
 Aphis viridescens (Del Guercio, 1930) c g
 Aphis viridissima  c g
 Aphis vitalbae Ferrari, 1872 c g
 Aphis vitexicola Kim, Hyojoong & Wonhoon Lee, 2006 c g
 Aphis viticis Ferrari, 1872 c g
 Aphis vitis Scopoli, 1763 c g
 Aphis vladimirovae  c g
 Aphis vurilocensis Nieto Nafría, P.A. Brown & López Ciruelos, 2017 c g
 Aphis wahena Hottes & Wehrle, 1951 c g
 Aphis wartenbergi (Börner, 1952) c g
 Aphis wellensteini (Börner, 1950) c g
 Aphis whiteshellensis Rojanavongse & Robinson, 1977 c g
 Aphis xylostei (Börner, 1950) c
 Aphis yangbajaingana Zhang, Guangxue, 1981 c g
 Aphis yomogii Shinji, 1922 c g
 Aphis zamorana García Prieto & Nieto Nafría, 2005 c g
 Aphis zapalina Mier Durante & Ortego, 2016 c g
 Aphis zhangi (Zhang, Likun, 2000) c g
 Aphis zonassa Knowlton, 1935 c g
 Aphis zweigelti (Börner, 1940) c g

Data sources: i = ITIS, c = Catalogue of Life, g = GBIF, b = Bugguide.net

References

Aphis